Duetos (English: Duets) is the third compilation album and ninth album by Mexican-American cumbia group A.B. Quintanilla y Los Kumbia Kings and the third compilation album by Mexican-American musician A.B. Quintanilla. It was released on March 29, 2005, by EMI Latin.

Track listing

DVD

A CD/DVD of the album was also released. It contains five music videos.

Sales and certifications

References

2005 compilation albums
2005 video albums
Kumbia Kings albums
A. B. Quintanilla albums
Albums produced by A.B. Quintanilla
Albums produced by Cruz Martínez
EMI Latin compilation albums
Spanish-language compilation albums
Music video compilation albums
Cumbia albums
Albums recorded at Q-Productions